Tu Men (February 1960 – 12 December 2021) was a Chinese actor of Evenks ethnicity.

Career
Tu is known for his portrayals of Genghis Khan in films such as Genghis Khan and An End to Killing. In 2018 he was at the center of a political dispute after referring to Taiwan as “Taiwan, China” drawing a rebuke from the leader of the Taiwan authorities. He died of esophageal cancer on 12 December 2021, at the age of 61.

Selected filmography

Film

Television series

Awards and nominations

References

External links
 
 

1960 births
2021 deaths
20th-century Chinese male actors
21st-century Chinese male actors
Chinese male film actors
Chinese male television actors
Shanghai Theatre Academy alumni
Deaths from esophageal cancer